Ihāia Te Kirikūmara (died 1873) was a notable New Zealand tribal leader. Of Māori descent, he identified with the Te Ati Awa iwi. He was born in Taranaki, New Zealand.

References

Te Āti Awa people
Year of birth missing
1873 deaths